Sand Bay is a bay on the coast of Somerset in England.

Sand Bay may also refer to:

Sand Bay, Ontario, a community in Canada on Lake Superior 
Sand Bay, Wisconsin, a community in the United States on Lake Superior

See also 
Sandy Bay (disambiguation)